Knowlesville is a hamlet in Orleans County, New York, United States. Knowlesville had a post office from March 11, 1826, until July 4, 2009; it still has its own ZIP code, 14479.

References

Hamlets in Orleans County, New York
Hamlets in New York (state)